Picture Windows is an American television miniseries that aired on Showtime in 1995. It consists of six short films, each inspired by a different iconic painting, matched with a story by a renowned author, and directed by a prominent filmmaker such as Norman Jewison, Peter Bogdanovich, Jonathan Kaplan, Joe Dante, John Boorman, and Bob Rafelson, respectively. With a different cast in each installment, these films included performances by a number of notable actors, including Alan Arkin, George Segal, Sally Kirkland, Robert Loggia, Steve Zahn, Brooke Adams, Dan Hedaya, Michael Lerner, Ron Perlman, and John Hurt. Co-creator David Wesley Wachs also wrote and directed a 20-minute pilot titled The Life of Art based on the painting Hitchhiker by Robert Gwathmey. Dan Halperin directed the pilot episode for the series entitled Rosemary, which was produced by Halperin and Scott JT Frank under their Epiphany Pictures banner.

Reception
The miniseries won one an Emmy Award and several CableAce Awards. John Boorman's episode, Two Nudes Bathing, was screened in the Un Certain Regard section at the 1995 Cannes Film Festival. The series was also acknowledged for the exceptional cinematography of Seamus Deasy and Paul Sarossy.

Episodes

References

External links

1990s American television miniseries
1995 American television series debuts
1990s American anthology television series
English-language television shows
Showtime (TV network) original programming